"Amazing" is a song performed by Italian singer Francesca Michielin. The song was released as a digital download on 28 March 2014 through Sony Music Entertainment Italy. The song peaked to number 74 on the Italian Singles Chart. The song, entirely composed in English was written by Michielin with Fausto Cogliati and Negin Djafari for the Italian version of the soundtrack of The Amazing Spider-Man 2.

Music video
A music video to accompany the release of "Amazing" was first released onto YouTube on 11 April 2014 at a total length of three minutes and forty-five seconds.

Track listing

Chart performance

Weekly charts

Release history

References

2014 songs
2014 singles
Francesca Michielin songs
Songs written for animated films
Songs from Spider-Man films
The Amazing Spider-Man (2012 film series)
Songs written by Negin Djafari